Wispolitics.com, sometimes styled as WisPolitics.com, is an online magazine and news service covering political and governmental news in Wisconsin. It issues hourly updates on daily events, political press releases, and political news.

WisPolitics Publishing, Inc., based in Madison, Wisconsin, was founded in 1999 by Phil Prange and Jeff Mayers.  Mayers was the former capitol bureau chief of the Wisconsin State Journal. Prange was a political consultant and businessman, who had worked for Tommy Thompson. Mayers was the president and Prange served as publisher from 1999 until 2011. On February 3, 2011 Wispolitics announced that it had been acquired by The Capital Times.  Mayers continues as president and J.R. Ross, formerly of the Associated Press, is editor-in-chief.

The core products of the service are daily political news summaries and weekly in-depth political reports delivered via e-mail, which are available by subscription. The company reports 120,000 monthly unique users on its sites.

WisPolitics.com company employs 10 people, including editors, reporters, programmers, and sales people. In 2004, the company expanded into Iowa by creating IowaPolitics.com.

WisPolitics conducts state political straw-polls at each of the Republican and Democratic party state conventions. In conjunction with the University of Wisconsin–Madison, they also conduct statewide voter polls.

Monthly newsmaker luncheons are held by WisPolitics in Madison and Washington, D.C. These feature legislative leadership, constitutional officers, and U.S. Congressional Representatives and Senators. Although aimed primarily at subscribers, they are open to the public.

Notable events in the history of WisPolitics 

May 1, 2000: Site is launched
July 1, 2002: Sister site WisOpinion.com is launched.
December 1, 2002: Sister site WisBusiness.com is launched.
January 1, 2004: Sister site IowaPolitics.com is launched.
February 3, 2011: Wispolitics acquired by the Capital Times newspaper.

References

External links
WisPolitics.com
WisOpinion.com

Communications in Wisconsin
WisPolitics.com
Internet properties established in 1999
1999 establishments in Wisconsin